Eulima acutissima is a species of sea snail, a marine gastropod mollusk in the family Eulimidae. The species is one of a number within the genus Eulima.

Description
The shell measures approximately 13 mm in length.

References

External links
 To World Register of Marine Species

acutissima
Gastropods described in 1866